Paengaroa is a village in the Bay of Plenty, New Zealand which lies 11 km from Te Puke, 35 km from Tauranga and 46.2 km from Rotorua.

Paengaroa is located on State Highway 33 approximately 2 km from the junction with State Highway 2, and at the eastern end of the Tauranga Eastern Motorway (TEL), which was opened in 2015.

Paengaroa is a largely rural settlement with many farms and a few shops. Some residents also commute to Tauranga. It has 2.27 hectares of commercial land.

Demographics
It is part of the wider Pongakawa statistical area.

Paengaroa had a population of 795 at the 2018 New Zealand census, an increase of 144 people (22.1%) since the 2013 census, and an increase of 171 people (27.4%) since the 2006 census. There were 285 households, comprising 411 males and 381 females, giving a sex ratio of 1.08 males per female, with 210 people (26.4%) aged under 15 years, 120 (15.1%) aged 15 to 29, 375 (47.2%) aged 30 to 64, and 90 (11.3%) aged 65 or older.

Ethnicities were 77.4% European/Pākehā, 29.4% Māori, 3.0% Pacific peoples, 4.5% Asian, and 1.5% other ethnicities. People may identify with more than one ethnicity.

Although some people chose not to answer the census's question about religious affiliation, 58.5% had no religion, 24.2% were Christian, 2.3% had Māori religious beliefs, 0.4% were Hindu, 0.8% were Buddhist and 3.8% had other religions.

Of those at least 15 years old, 69 (11.8%) people had a bachelor's or higher degree, and 141 (24.1%) people had no formal qualifications. 72 people (12.3%) earned over $70,000 compared to 17.2% nationally. The employment status of those at least 15 was that 336 (57.4%) people were employed full-time, 84 (14.4%) were part-time, and 18 (3.1%) were unemployed.

Notable people from Paengaroa 

 Kiri Allan (born 1984), Member of Parliament for the East Coast electorate and current Minister of Justice

Education

Paengaroa School is a co-educational state primary school for Year 1 to 6 students.

References 

Western Bay of Plenty District
Populated places in the Bay of Plenty Region